Paximadi is a small islet off the coast of the Greek island of Crete in the Aegean Sea. The islet is administered from Gouves in Heraklion regional unit.

Landforms of Heraklion (regional unit)
Uninhabited islands of Crete
Islands of Greece